Sipoonkorpi National Park is a national park in Finland. It was established on March 2, 2011. It is located in the municipalities of Helsinki, Vantaa and Sipoo.

The area is mostly covered by spruce forest, swamps and cultural landscape. The small Byabäcken river, home to a rich bird population, flows through Sipoonkorpi.

References

External links
 Outdoors.fi – Sipoonkorpi National Park
 
 

2011 establishments in Finland
Protected areas established in 2011
Sipoo
Parks in Helsinki
Vantaa
Geography of Uusimaa
Tourist attractions in Uusimaa
National parks of Finland